Wyndham City Stadium is a proposed football stadium in Tarneit, Victoria, Australia. It is scheduled to open in 2026 as the home ground of Western United FC.

History
As part of its successful bid to enter the A-League in 2019, Western United FC committed to build a 15,000 seat soccer-specific stadium in Tarneit to the west of Melbourne. It will be the first major venue in Australia to be exclusively owned and operated by an A-League club, being funded through value capture.

A training facility will be built adjacent to the new stadium. Early works on the site commenced in October 2021. It is scheduled for completion in 2023.

On 29 May 2022, Western United chief executive Chris Pehlivanis revealed the current timeline for the stadium is for it to be ready in time for the 2025/26 A-League season. Pehlivanis also confirmed that Western United would begin to play home games at their training base from the 2023/24 A-League season, once the 5,000 seat training facility is built, before moving to the completed main stadium two years later.

References

Sport in the City of Wyndham
Proposed sports venues in Australia
Stadiums under construction

Western United FC